Women in Refrigerators (or WiR) is a website created in 1999 by a group of feminist comic-book fans that lists examples of the superhero comic-book trope whereby female characters are injured, raped, killed, or depowered (an event colloquially known as fridging), sometimes to stimulate "protective" traits, and often as a plot device intended to move a male character's story arc forward, and seeks to analyze why these plot devices are used disproportionately on female characters.

History

The term "Women in Refrigerators" was coined by writer Gail Simone as a name for the website in early 1999 during online discussions about comic books with friends. It refers to an incident in Green Lantern vol. 3 #54 (1994), written by Ron Marz, in which Kyle Rayner, the title hero, comes home to his apartment to find that his girlfriend, Alexandra DeWitt, had been killed by the villain Major Force and stuffed into a refrigerator. Simone and her colleagues then developed a list of fictional female characters who had been "killed, maimed or depowered", in particular in ways that treated the female characters as mere devices to move forward a male character's story arc, rather than as fully developed characters in their own right. The list was then circulated via the Internet over Usenet, bulletin board systems, email and electronic mailing lists. Simone also e-mailed many comic book creators directly for their responses to the list.

The list is infamous in certain comic book fan circles. Respondents often found different meanings to the list itself, though Simone maintained that her simple point had always been: "If you demolish most of the characters girls like, then girls won't read comics. That's it!"

Journalist Beau Yarbrough created the initial design and coding on the original site. Technology consultant John Bartol edited the content. Robert Harris, a librarian and comic-book fan, contributed to site maintenance and updates along with fan John Norris. The idea for placing the list online originated with software developer Jason Yu, who also served as the original site host.

Creator response
Simone received numerous e-mail responses from comic book fans and professionals. Some responses were neutral and others were positive. Additionally, arguments on the merits of the list were published on comic-book fan sites in early 1999.

Simone published many of the responses she received on the website.

Several comic book creators indicated that the list caused them to pause and think about the stories they were creating. Often these responses contained arguments for or against the use of death or injury of female characters as a plot device. A list of some responses from comic book professionals is included on the site. Marz's reply stated (in part): "To me the real difference is less male–female than main character – supporting character. In most cases, main characters, 'title' characters who support their own books, are male. ... the supporting characters are the ones who suffer the more permanent and shattering tragedies. And a lot of supporting characters are female."

"Dead Men Defrosting"
In response to fans who argued that male characters are also often killed, content editor John Bartol wrote "Dead Men Defrosting", an article arguing that when male heroes are killed or altered, they are more typically returned to their status quo. According to Bartol's claim, after most female characters are altered they are "never allowed, as male heroes usually are, the chance to return to their original heroic states. And that's where we begin to see the difference".

Discussing the site in his book Dangerous Curves: Action Heroes, Gender, Fetishism and Popular Culture, Bowling Green State University professor Jeffrey A. Brown noted that while male comic book heroes have tended to die heroically and be magically brought back from the dead afterwards, female characters have been likelier to be casually but irreparably wounded or killed, often in a sexualized fashion. To support his claim, he cited the Joker shattering the original Batgirl's spine just for fun, resulting in her being written as a wheelchair user for over a decade. He also cites the torture and murder of Stephanie Brown by the villain Black Mask.

In popular culture

References in mass culture
In 2000, several national newspapers ran articles that referenced the site, generating discussion on the topic of sexism in pop culture and the comic-book industry. Some universities also list the content of Women in Refrigerators as related to analysis and critique of pop culture.

Within the comics medium, during the 2009 DC storyline "Blackest Night", Alexandra DeWitt was one of many deceased characters temporarily brought back to life as part of the Black Lantern Corps. While she appeared briefly, she was seen inside a refrigerator construct at all times.

Courtney Enlow, editor at Your Tango, criticized the death of Kathy Stabler, the wife of detective Elliot Stabler in Law & Order: Special Victims Unit, as an example of the "tired, sexist" trope.

Brian Tallerico of Vulture, when reviewing "The Whole World Is Watching", an episode of the 2021 live-action Disney+ miniseries The Falcon and the Winter Soldier, was critical of the death of Lemar Hoskins, a black person, as an example of racial, rather than sexist, fridging, to further the story arc of John Walker, a white person.

Deadtown
In December 2018, Deadline Hollywood reported that Amazon Studios was developing a television series called Deadtown, an adaptation of the Catherynne M. Valente novel The Refrigerator Monologues. The story centers upon five recently deceased women who meet in a purgatory-like location called Deadtown, where they discover that their entire lives, including their deaths, were merely in service of providing emotional backstory for male superheroes.

Notable contributors
Several contributors to the site and the original list later became comic book creators and entertainment industry professionals:
 Brian Joines – writer of the independent comic The 7 Guys of Justice and as of 2006 publishing new comics through Platinum Studios.
 Greg Dean Schmitz – creator of UpcomingMovies.com, AKA Greg's Previews, and columnist for CBR.com.
 Gail Simone – author of several comic books including Birds of Prey for DC Comics and Marvel's Deadpool.

See also
 Comic book death
 The Hawkeye Initiative
 Portrayal of women in American comics
 Redshirt (stock character)

References

External links

 
 

Websites about comics
Misogyny
Internet properties established in 1999
Women and comics
Feminist websites